Angela Angel (born December 26, 1979) is an American politician. Affiliated with the Democratic Party, she represented district 25 in the Maryland House of Delegates from 2015 to 2019. She is currently a candidate for the Democratic nomination for Maryland's 4th congressional district.

Background
Angel was born in South Bend, Indiana. She received her undergraduate degree at Virginia's Hampton University. Angel then graduated from the Benjamin N. Cardozo School of Law at Yeshiva University, where she received her Juris Doctor in 2004. She served as a judicial fellow to Judge James A. Yates of the New York Supreme Court from 2004 to 2005. She was admitted to New York Bar in 2005.

Angel first got involved with politics in 2000, when she worked as a legislative aide to Virginia state Delegate Mary T. Christian. In 2010, Angel served as the principal coordinator for policy and politics in Prince George's County for Governor Martin O'Malley, and later served as legislator director for the Prince George's County Delegation until 2011. From there, she worked as a client services specialist for the Prince George's County Council until 2014, when she began working as the legislative affairs counsel for the Prince George's Department of Environmental Protection.

In the legislature
From 2015 to 2019, Angel served on the Health and Government Operations committee in the Maryland House of Delegates. She was also a member of the Legislative Black Caucus of Maryland.

In March 2018, Angel said that she was sexually harassed while working in the Maryland General Assembly, saying that she "felt defenseless when she was accosted in front of other people and no one came to her defense".

Angel announced that she would run for the Maryland Senate on November 8, 2017, seeking to succeed retiring state Senator Ulysses Currie. She lost the Democratic primary to former state Delegate Melony G. Griffith, receiving 36.8 percent of the vote to Griffith's 55.0 percent.

2022 U.S. House campaign

On December 20, 2021, Angel announced her bid for the Democratic nomination in Maryland's 4th congressional district.

Personal life
In June 2012, Angel briefly lived in a homeless shelter after escaping an abusive marriage. She is a single mother of five children. She is Catholic.

Political positions

Development initiatives
During her House campaign, Angel said that she would support efforts to bring the FBI headquarters to Prince George's County.

Education
During her House campaign, Angel said that she supported universal pre-K.

Health care
In 2018, Angel was a sponsor of the Healthy Maryland Act, a bill that would establish a universal single-payer healthcare system in Maryland.

Immigration
In November 2015, Angel signed a letter condemning Governor Larry Hogan's decision to block Syrian refugees from resettling to Maryland.

Social issues
During the 2016 legislative session, Angel introduced legislation to change the definition of abuse to include harassment and malicious destruction of property. The bill died in the House Judicial Proceedings Committee, prompting Angel to attach her legislation as an amendment, which passed the House with a vote of 65-60, to a domestic-violence-related bill introduced by state Senator Victor R. Ramirez. Veteran lawmakers accused Angel of violating constitutional rules by making this move, with House parliamentarian William Frick arguing that reviving a dead bill by grafting it onto a live bill "upends the integrity of the committee system that first put the brakes on Angel's legislation". The House passed Ramirez's bill as amended, but the legislation died in the Senate.

Angel supported a 2018 historically Black colleges and universities lawsuit against the state of Maryland, saying that "institutions with predominantly Black student bodies should be given equitable funding by the state with those with White students in the majority".

Electoral history

References

Democratic Party members of the Maryland House of Delegates
African-American state legislators in Maryland
1979 births
Living people
People from South Bend, Indiana
Hampton University alumni
Yeshiva University alumni
New York (state) lawyers
Women state legislators in Maryland
21st-century American politicians
21st-century American women politicians
21st-century African-American women
21st-century African-American politicians
20th-century African-American people
20th-century African-American women
African-American Catholics
Candidates in the 2022 United States House of Representatives elections